Ali Gharbi (18 April 1955 - 12 December 2009) was a Tunisian former swimmer who competed in the 1976 Summer Olympics. He was considered the best Arab and African swimmer before the rise of Oussama Mellouli. In 1977, he joined his teammate in the national team, Myriam Mizouni, at Esperance Sportif in Tunis and, together, they won numerous events. He died at the age of 54 after a long illness.

References

1955 births
2009 deaths
Tunisian male freestyle swimmers
Olympic swimmers of Tunisia
Swimmers at the 1976 Summer Olympics
Mediterranean Games gold medalists for Tunisia
Mediterranean Games bronze medalists for Tunisia
Swimmers at the 1975 Mediterranean Games
African Games medalists in swimming
African Games gold medalists for Tunisia
African Games silver medalists for Tunisia
Mediterranean Games medalists in swimming
Competitors at the 1973 All-Africa Games
Competitors at the 1978 All-Africa Games
20th-century Tunisian people
21st-century Tunisian people